Laoag International Airport is the main airport serving the general area of Laoag, the capital city of the province of Ilocos Norte in the Philippines. It is the only airport in Ilocos Norte and is the northernmost international airport in the Philippines.

It has one 2,784-meter runway and is designated as a secondary/alternate international airport by the Civil Aviation Authority of the Philippines, a body of the Department of Transportation that is responsible for the operations of not only this airport but also of all other airports in the Philippines except the major international airports.

History

Early history
The land on which the airport sits today is located near the Ilocos Norte sand dunes at the mouth of Padsan River. During the American colonial period, a military airfield located in the northern part of Luzon became imperative. Laoag, the most populated settlement at the time was chosen as the site. It became known as Gabu Airfield.

World War II
During the initial invasion of the Japanese in the Philippines in December 1941, Gabu Airfield was captured and subsequently used it. During the Luzon campaign to retake the islands from the Japanese, Major Simeon Valdez led a raid on the airfield, burning the headquarters and setting fire to a fuel dump. Similar attacks follow in the succeeding days until its abandonment on February 15, 1945, when it was abandoned due to Commonwealth military and guerrilla raids. It was then recaptured on February 27, 1945.

By April 1945 the airfield was again operational hosting fighter and transport aircraft. Colonel Arvid E. Olson, Jr. became the Base Commander and assumed all its administrative functions. The airfield became a staging area for flights and air missions against Japanese forces in Northern Luzon by April and became an important refueling point for planes en route to Okinawa  and an even more important emergency and rescue base for planes returning from Formosa and China.

Contemporary history
After the war, the airfield was converted into a civilian airport. It mostly catered to domestic flights from Manila and international flights from nearby countries of China, Hong Kong and Singapore and as far as Honolulu, Hawaii.

In 2003, the airport is an epicenter of concern for authorities during the 2002–2004 SARS outbreak during which it continued to receive flights from China and Singapore, two of the most affected countries.

The airport became one of the stops of the Breitling DC-3 World Tour held in 2017. The aircraft, a Douglas DC-3 with the registration number HB-IRJ landed for refueling in April as part of a round-the-world flight to celebrate the plane's 77th birthday.

The airport was also where 4 FA-50 light fighter aircraft were stored during the testing of Israeli radars on Paredes Air Station in Pasuquin, Ilocos Norte. There are plans to store FA-50s on the airport as a warning squadron for any disaster/threat to the northern part of the Philippines.

Structure

Runway
The runway runs at a direction of 01°/19°. It is equipped with runway lights but not an instrument landing system, limiting operations during severe weather. Since March 2022, the airport can accommodate wide-body aircraft such as the Airbus A330.

Terminal
A single terminal building serves both passenger and cargo traffic. As an international airport, it houses immigration desks for screening of arriving international passengers. It is also equipped with a carousel baggage at the reclaim area for passengers with checked-in items.

The terminal previously had a combined capacity of 140 international and domestic passengers. It has since been expanded in 2021 to accommodate 200 international and 240 domestic passengers.

Airlines and destinations

Statistics
Data from Civil Aviation Authority of the Philippines (CAAP). An em dash (—) is used if data from CAAP is not available.

See also
Louis Edward Curdes
3d Fighter Squadron (Commando), an American air unit based in Laoag during World War II
353d Special Operations Group, formerly known as 3d Air Commando Group, another air unit based in Laoag during World War II

References

External links
Laoag International Airport

Airports in the Philippines
Buildings and structures in Laoag
Airfields of the United States Army Air Forces in the Philippines